Clothes is a lost 1914 silent film directed by Francis Powers and starring Charlotte Ives and House Peters. It was based on a 1906 play by Avery Hopwood and Channing Pollock.

Cast
Charlotte Ives - Olive Sherwood
House Peters - Arnold West
Edward MacKay - Richard Burbank
Frederick Webber - Horace Watling
Josephine Drake - Anna Watling
Minna Gale Haynes - Mrs. Cathcart
Mimi Yvonne - Ruth Watling

References

External links
 Clothes at IMDb.com

1914 films
Famous Players-Lasky films
American films based on plays
Lost American films
American silent feature films
American black-and-white films
1910s American films